Seok Ha-jung (also Seok Ha-jeong 석 하정, born January 11, 1985, as Shi Lei) is a Chinese-born South Korean table tennis player. She won four bronze medals at major international competitions: two at the 2009 East Asian Games and one each at the 2010 Asian Games and 2012 World Championships. Her team placed fourth at the 2012 Summer Olympics. Her world ranking varied from 12 to 65 between 2008 and 2014, peaking in early 2011.

References

External links
 

Olympic table tennis players of South Korea
1985 births
Living people
Table tennis players at the 2012 Summer Olympics
Asian Games bronze medalists for South Korea
Chinese emigrants to South Korea
Medalists at the 2010 Asian Games
Asian Games medalists in table tennis
Table tennis players at the 2010 Asian Games
Naturalised table tennis players
Table tennis players from Anshan
Naturalized citizens of South Korea